Banyumasan, also known as the autoglottonym Ngapak, is a dialect of Javanese spoken mainly in three areas of Java that is the Banyumasan, located in westernmost Central Java province and surrounding the Slamet mountain and Serayu River; a neighboring area inside West Java province; and northern region of Banten province. This area includes Cilacap, Kebumen, Banjarnegara, Purbalingga, Banyumas, Pemalang, Tegal, and Brebes regencies, together with independent cities within that region.

History 
Scholars divide the development of Javanese language into four different stages:
 9th–13th century, known as Old Javanese.
 13th–16th century, developed to Middle Javanese.
 16th–20th century, developed to Early Modern Javanese.
 Since 20th century, developed to Modern Javanese.

The phases above were influenced by the emergence of empires in Java. In Javanese cultural history, empires yielded some distinct grades of language, each grade representing the social grade of the speakers (mainly nobles and populaces). Those grades of language are not of significant influence to Banyumasan people. In the Banyumasan region, high grades are usually used only when speaking to a stranger assumed to come from the eastern area of Java i.e. Yogyakarta / Surakarta etc., or on certain occasions. Nowadays the Banyumasan people use high grade Javanese to a stranger, a noble man and older people. Surakartan and Yogyakartan style are usually considered the standard Javanese language.

Vocabulary 
Banyumasan many differences compared to standard Javanese, mainly in phonology, pronunciation and vocabulary. This happened due to cultural or character distinction and widely current usage of Old Javanese vocabulary. Another distinction is that the pronunciation of the vowels is not as complicated.

Vocabulary distinction is basically found in:
Same word and phonetic but different meaning
Same word and meaning but different phonetic
Same phonetic and meaning but different pronunciation (changed on consonant or vowel).

Politeness
Javanese speech varies depending on social context, yielding three distinct styles, or registers. Each style employs its own vocabulary, grammatical rules and even prosody. This is not unique to Javanese; neighbouring Austronesian languages as well as East Asian languages such as Korean, Japanese and Thai share similar constructions.

In Javanese these styles are called:
Ngoko is informal speech, used between friends and close relatives. It is also used by persons of higher status to persons of lower status, such as elders to younger people or bosses to subordinates.
Madya is the intermediary form between ngoko and krama. An example of the context where one would use madya is an interaction between strangers on the street, where one wants to be neither too formal nor too informal.
Krama is the polite and formal style. It is used between persons of the same status who do not wish to be informal. It is also the official style for public speeches, announcements, etc.

In the Banyumasan region, Madya and Krama styles are rarely used, usually towards a stranger who is assumed to come from the eastern area of Java such as Yogyakarta, Surakarta etc. or on certain occasions, an eastern style of language named  (from ).

Dialects and sub-dialects
There are three main dialects of Banyumasan: North area (Tegalan), South area (Banyumasan), and Banten.

The Tegalan dialect is spoken in northern areas of Banyumasan: Tanjung, Ketanggungan, Larangan, Brebes, Slawi, Moga, Pemalang, Surodadi, and Tegal.

The Banyumasan dialect is spoken in southern areas: Bumiayu, Karang Pucung, Cilacap, Nusakambangan Island, Kroya, Ajibarang, Wangon, Purwokerto, Purbalingga, Bobotsari, Banjarnegara, Purwareja, Kebumen, and Gombong.

The Banten dialect is spoken in north Banten.

In addition, there are several sub-dialects spoken in Banyumasan, such as Bumiayu, Dayeuhluhur, and Ayah.

See also 
Javanese script
Java (island)
Hans Ras
Banyumasan people

References

External links 

 Javanese writing system

Javanese language